Gregorian is a German band headed by Frank Peterson that performs Gregorian chant-inspired versions of modern pop and rock songs. The band features both vocal harmony and instrumental accompaniment. They competed in Unser Lied für Stockholm, the German national selection for the Eurovision Song Contest 2016, and placed 5th in the first round of public voting with the song "Masters of Chant", failing to make the Top 3 with 9.06% of the public vote.

Band history 
Originally, Gregorian was conceived as a more pop-oriented group in the vein of Enigma. Under this concept, Peterson together with Matthias Meissner and Thomas Schwarz, recorded the 1991 album Sadisfaction, with lead vocals provided by The Sisters of Oz: Susana Espelleta (Peterson's wife at the time) and Birgit Freud. However, this was the only album by the trio in that style.

In 1998, Peterson and his team of Jan-Eric Kohrs, Michael Soltau and Carsten Heusmann re-invented the project to perform popular songs in the Gregorian style. The criteria for song selection were strict; in order to be considered, a song needed to be translatable into the 7-tone scale. For each album, songs were carefully chosen in addition to original songs written by Jan-Eric Kohrs, Amelia Brightman and Carsten Heussman. Twelve vocalists - previously acclaimed session and choir singers - were then hired to record the tracks.

Each Gregorian album was initially digitally tracked at Nemo Studios, Peterson's Hamburg studio. The vocalists then record their parts in a church atmosphere with dimmed lights and candles, in order to escape what Peterson referred to in a 2001 interview as the "cold and technical" studio atmosphere.

The concept proved to be successful, and the group proceeded to record several more albums in the same style as Masters of Chant. Known as the ten "Chapters", said album releases primarily featured covers of well-known or popular songs (ex. Phil Collins' "In the Air Tonight", Alphaville's "Forever Young"; Celine Dion's "My Heart Will Go On", etc.) done in the group's chant-inspired style, though occasionally the group would release original compositions as well. Their 2004 album, The Dark Side, was a slight departure from the others, featuring a darker repertoire; similarly, the group released themed albums such as the Christmas-themed Christmas Chants, another dark-repertoire album with The Dark Side of the Chant (2010), and the themed Epic Chants (2012). In 2005, The Masterpieces, a compilation album with a live DVD, was released.

Tours 
Gregorian has toured parts of Europe, China, Russia and Japan. Live concert DVDs have also been released.

Band singers 
The male singers of Gregorian are/were Adrian Coverdale-Hill, Alain Bernard, Alexandre Mack, Andrew Busher, Andrew Keelan, Ashley Turnell, Ben Regan, Benjamin Clee, Benoit Riou, Berwyn Pearce, Brendan Matthew, Chris Goater, Chris Hogan, Christopher Tickner, Daniel Hoadley, Daniel Williams, David Chabert, David Porter-Thomas, David Tilley, Douglas Lee, Edward Hands, Frederic Bernard, Gauthier Fenoy, Gerard O'Beirne, Gregory Moore, Jeremy Birchall, John Grave, John Langley, Jonathan Clucas, Karim Bouzra, Lawrence White, Loic Boissier, Mark Anderson, Mark Bradbury, Matthew Long, Matthew Minter, Matthew Vine, Michael Dore, Narcis Iustin Ianău, Nicolas Kern, Paul Badley, Peter Sturt, Phil Conway, Pierre Kuzor, Rhys Bowden, Richard Collier, Richard Naxton, Robert Fardell, Robert Johnston, Roger Langford, Simon Baker, Simon Grant, Sion Lloyd, Stephane Werchowski, Stephen Miles, Stephen Weller, Thomas Barnard, Thomas Phillips, Timothy Holmes, Timothy Lacy, William King, William Purefoy and Yves Blanchard.

The female singers of Gregorian are/were Amelia Brightman, Anna-Lena Strasse, Anette Stangeberg, Charlotte Cracht, Eva Mali (Zarina Maliti), Joana Adu, Julia Dorandt, Marjan Shaki, Sarah Brightman, and Stefanie Hundertmark.

Discography 
Gregorian has released ten albums in their Masters of Chant series and a number of other albums, including a Christmas album and several compilations. They have also released two types of video album; live concerts and music video albums featuring the singers in various surroundings.

Initial project
 1991: Sadisfaction (album)
 1991: "So Sad" (single)
 1991: "Once in a Lifetime" (single)

Masters of Chant albums 
 1999: Masters of Chant
 2001: Masters of Chant Chapter II
 2002: Masters of Chant Chapter III
 2003: Masters of Chant Chapter IV
 2004: The Dark Side (called Masters of Chant V in Oceania but distinct from the 2006 album of that name)
 2006: Masters of Chant Chapter V
 2007: Masters of Chant Chapter VI
 2009: Masters of Chant Chapter VII
 2010: Dark Side of the Chant
 2011: Masters of Chant Chapter VIII
 2012: Epic Chants
 2013: Masters of Chant Chapter IX
 2014: Winter Chants
 2015: Masters of Chant X: The Final Chapter
 2017: Holy Chants
 2021: Pure Chants
 2022: Pure Chants II

Other albums/compilations 
 2005: The Masterpieces (Best of CD and live DVD)
 2006: Christmas Chants
 2007: Masters of Chant (Curb Records)
 2011: Best of 1990–2010
 2016: Live! Masters of Chant - Final Chapter Tour
 2017: Masters of Chant — The Platinum Collection
 2019: 20/2020

Singles 
 "Masters of Chant" (1999)
 "I Still Haven't Found What I'm Looking For" (2000)
 "Losing My Religion" (2000)
 "Moment of Peace" (2001)
 "Voyage Voyage" (2001)
 "Join Me" (2002)
 "The Gift" (2003)
 "Angels" (2003)
 "Where the Wild Roses Grow" (2004)
 "O Fortuna" (2010)

Video albums 
 2001: Masters of Chant in Santiago de Compostela
 2001: Moments of Peace in Ireland
 2002: Masters of Chant Chapter III
 2003: Gold Edition
 2005: The Masterpieces
 2007: Masters of Chant: Live at Kreuzenstein Castle
 2008: Christmas Chants & Visions
 2011: Masters of Chant Chapter 8 (Gregorian Live in Europe 2011: The Dark Side of the Chant) - Limited Edition (CD & DVD)
 2012: Epic Chants "Dark Side of the Chants Live in Zagreb" - Limited Edition (CD & DVD)
 2013: Epic Chants Tour 2013 "Live in Belgrade" - Deluxe Edition (CD & DVD)
 2016: Masters of Chant - Final Chapter Tour (CD & DVD, blu-ray) (Limited Fan Edition including 4 additional music videos and the complete concert on double CD)

References

External links 

  
 Dansk side

German musical groups
New-age music groups
Cover bands